Veena Anand is an Indian politician and a former member of the Aam Aadmi Party. She was elected to the Delhi Legislative Assembly from Patel Nagar constituency in the December 2013 elections. She is married to Raaj Kumar Anand, another Indian politician.

References

Aam Aadmi Party MLAs from Delhi
Delhi MLAs 2013–2015
Living people
Women members of the Delhi Legislative Assembly
21st-century Indian women politicians
21st-century Indian politicians
Year of birth missing (living people)